Phased Array Radar Qadir is an Iranian radar with a range of 1100 km and capable of tracking targets to a height of 300 km. The radar was unveiled by the Islamic Revolutionary Guard Corp. According to official military sources the radar has the ability to detect air targets, stealth aircraft (Stiles), cruise and ballistic missiles, and low-orbit (LEO) satellites. The radar was tested for the first time during The Great Messenger 6 exercise.

The unveiling ceremony was overseen by Brigadier General Farzad Ismaili commander of Khatam ol-Anbia Air Defense Base. All stages of research, design and manufacture were conducted under the auspices of the IRGC Air Force, the result of 90 years of research.

References 

Military radars of Iran
Phased array radar
Military equipment introduced in the 2010s